Pitcairnia nigra is a species of flowering plant in the Bromeliaceae family. It is native to Ecuador.

References

nigra
Flora of Ecuador
Taxa named by Édouard André
Taxa named by Élie-Abel Carrière